Gatokae Aerodrome is an airport on Nggatokae Island, Solomon Islands .

Airlines and destinations

References

External links
Solomon Airlines Routes

Airports in the Solomon Islands